"Grown Men Don't Cry" is a song written by Tom Douglas and Steve Seskin and recorded by American country music artist Tim McGraw. It was released in March 2001 as the first single from McGraw's 2001 album Set This Circus Down. The song reached number one on the US Billboard Hot Country Singles & Tracks (now Hot Country Songs) chart and peaked at number 25 on the Billboard Hot 100.

Content
In the song's first verse, the narrator pulled into the grocery store, and he saw a boy wrapping around the legs of his mother. She had mascara tears running down her face like an ice cream cone melting, due to the years of bad decision. The narrator bought his groceries, came back out, and returns home. In the second verse, the narrator had a dream about his elderly father. He was 10 years old, and he holds the narrator's hand. They were talking on the front porch to watch the sunset, due to the dream that he was a slave to the elderly father's job, and the elderly father is no longer around. So the narrator placed a red rose on the elderly father's grave, and he talks to the wind. In the third and final verse, the narrator sat here with his kids and his wife, and everything that holds dear in the narrator's life. They went upstairs, and got ready for bed, but the little girl said that she hadn't heard her story yet. She lifts her head of off her pillows, and said "I love you dad".

Critical reception
Kevin John Coyne of Country Universe gave the song an A grade, and he praised the "combination of the vivid imagery and McGraw’s plaintive vocal performance." He also said that the second verse "is so well-crafted, and McGraw delivers it so masterfully that it always surprises me, no matter how many times I hear it."

Chart performance
"Grown Men Don't Cry" debuted at number 30 on the U.S. Billboard Hot Country Singles & Tracks for the chart week of March 24, 2001.

Year-end charts

References

2001 singles
2001 songs
Tim McGraw songs
Songs written by Steve Seskin
Songs written by Tom Douglas (songwriter)
Song recordings produced by Byron Gallimore
Song recordings produced by Tim McGraw
Song recordings produced by James Stroud
Country ballads
Curb Records singles